Leonard Barkan (born October 6, 1944) is the Class of 1943 University Professor of Comparative Literature at Princeton University. He won Berlin Prize, Ellen Maria Gorrissen Fellow in Fall 2009. He won the 2001 Harry Levin Prize. Barkan shared the PEN/Architectural Digest Award for Literary Writing on the Visual Arts for Unearthing the Past with Deborah Silverman in 2001.

Life
Barkan taught at the University of California, San Diego, Northwestern University, University of Michigan, and New York University. He was visiting scholar at the Free University of Berlin. He is a Fellow of the New York Institute for the Humanities.

Barkan was elected as a member of the American Academy of Arts and Sciences in 1994, and a member of the American Philosophical Society in 2005.

Works
The Gods Made Flesh: Metamorphosis and the Pursuit of Paganism, Yale University Press, 1986, 

Satyr Square: A Year, a Life in Rome, Northwestern University Press, 2008, 
Michelangelo: a life on paper, Princeton University Press, 2010, 
Berlin for Jews: A Twenty-First-Century Companion, University of Chicago Press, 2016, 
 Reading Shakespeare Reading Me, Fordham University Press, 2022,

References

External links

 "An Appetite for Scholarship" by Leonard Barkan, September 12, 2008, The Chronicle of Higher Education
 "In Rome, AAR Resident Leonard Barkan Explores the Place of Food Culture in Renaissance Art and Thought", February 16, 2010

1944 births
Living people
University of California, San Diego faculty
Northwestern University faculty
Princeton University faculty
University of Michigan faculty
New York University faculty
Members of the American Philosophical Society